Municipal elections were held in the city of Montreal, Quebec, Canada on November 3, 2013 as part of the 2013 Quebec municipal elections. Voters elected 65 positions on the Montreal City Council, including the mayor, borough mayors, and city councillors, as well as 38 borough councillors. Denis Coderre replaced interim mayor Laurent Blanchard, who was elected to replace the previous interim mayor, Michael Applebaum, who resigned due to 14 charges laid against him including fraud, conspiracy, breach of trust, and corruption in municipal affairs. Previous elected mayor Gérald Tremblay left office on November 5, 2012 after his party Union Montréal was suspected of corruption and mafia involvement. On July 2, 2013, Louise Harel, leader of the opposition Vision Montréal, announced she would not be running for mayor, instead supporting Marcel Côté.

Final list of Mayor of Montreal candidates

Confirmed

Withdrawn
On October 30, Paunel Paterne Matondot decided to withdraw his nomination as mayor of Montreal at the election of November 3.

Declined
 Raymond Bachand - MNA for Outremont
 Michel Bédard - Former candidate
 Gilles Duceppe - Former Leader of the Bloc Québécois
 Liza Frulla - Former MP
 Louise Harel - Leader of Vision Montréal
 Michel Labrecque - STM President
 David La Haye - Actor, producer
 Normand Legault - Entrepreneur
 Irois Léger - Former journalist
 Gilbert Rozon - Founder of Just for Laughs

Opinion polls

For mayor

Denis Coderre's support remained steady in public opinion polling during the campaign, while the other established "major" candidates – Marcel Côté and Richard Bergeron – largely failed to make an impression. Instead, a lesser-known candidate, Mélanie Joly, pulled ahead of both Côté and Bergeron in public opinion polling to emerge as the second-place contender by the time of the final published poll.

Results
Denis Coderre confirmed polls prior to the election by winning the post of mayor of Montreal with 32.15% of votes and with a majority of 26,405 votes over Mélanie Joly, his closest rival.

His party, Équipe Coderre pour Montréal, gained 27 of the 65 seats within city council. Meanwhile, Projet Montréal, led by Richard Bergeron, gained the status of official opposition by winning 20 seats. Marcel Côté's Coalition Montréal won only 6 seats and Mélanie Joly's Vrai changement pour Montréal won 4.

Composition of city and borough councils

Depending on their borough, Montrealers voted for:
 
 Mayor of Montreal
 Borough mayor (except in Ville-Marie, whose mayor is the Mayor of Montreal), who is also a city councillor
 A city councillor for the whole borough or for each district, who is also a borough councillor (Outremont and L'Île-Bizard–Sainte-Geneviève have no city councillors other than the borough mayor)
 Zero, one, or two additional borough councillors for each district

Seat-by-seat results
Nominations were open from September 20 to October 4.

Candidate statistics

Party names are the official ones registered with Élection Montréal.

Union Montréal was officially dissolved on May 9, 2013.

Ahuntsic-Cartierville

Anjou

Côte-des-Neiges–Notre-Dame-de-Grâce

L'Île-Bizard–Sainte-Geneviève

Lachine

LaSalle

Mercier–Hochelaga-Maisonneuve

Montréal-Nord

Outremont

Pierrefonds-Roxboro

Le Plateau-Mont-Royal

Rivière-des-Prairies–Pointe-aux-Trembles

Rosemont–La Petite-Patrie

Saint-Laurent

Saint-Léonard

Le Sud-Ouest

Verdun

Ville-Marie

Villeray–Saint-Michel–Parc-Extension

References

Municipal elections in Montreal
2013 Quebec municipal elections
2010s in Montreal
2013 in Quebec